Mariya Koryttseva and Tatiana Poutchek were the defending champions, but Koryttseva chose not to participate that year.
Poutchek partnered with Olga Govortsova, and they won in the final 3–6, 6–2, [10–8], against Kimiko Date-Krumm and Sun Tiantian.

Seeds

  Anabel Medina Garrigues /  Arantxa Parra Santonja (first round)
  Yung-jan Chan /  Katarina Srebotnik (first round)
  Peng Shuai /  Xu Yifan (quarterfinals)
  Akgul Amanmuradova /  Ayumi Morita (first round)

Draw

External links
 Main Draw

Guangzhou International Women's Open
Guangzhou International Women's Open - Doubles